Satya Widya Yudha (SWY) is currently a Member of the National Energy Council of the Republic of Indonesia (DEN-RI) for the 2020-2025 period, after being proposed and appointed by the President of the Republic of Indonesia with the approval of the Indonesian Parliament.

The National Energy Council or DEN is a national, independent institution, consisting of leadership and members, and chaired by the President of the Republic of Indonesia, with the Deputy Chair being the Vice President of the Republic of Indonesia, and the Daily Chair being held by the Minister of Energy and Mineral Resources. Members of the National Energy Council consist of 15 people, namely 7 (seven) Ministers (Minister of Bappenas, Minister of Finance, Minister of Industry, Minister of Forestry & Environment, Minister of Agriculture, Minister of Research and Technology / Chair of the National Agency for Research and Innovation) and eight people from Stakeholders representing stake holders / stakeholders in the energy sector.

From October 2014 to February 2018 he served as Vice Chairman of Commission VII of the House of Representatives of the Republic of Indonesia—overseeing energy, mineral resources, environment, forestry, research and technology. He currently serves as Vice Chairman of Commission I overseeing defense, foreign affairs, communication and informatics, and intelligence from March 2018- September 2019. He is also the chairman of the Green Economy and Alternative Energy Caucus (GEC) of the House of Representatives. The GEC consists of members of Parliament from various political parties and commissions who are concerned with the environment and sustainable development. He is also Chairman of the Indonesia-India Bilateral Cooperation Group of the House of Representatives. He has had more than 23 years of experience in the oil and gas industry, both in Indonesia and overseas.

Satya Widya Yudha served as a member of the House of Representatives for the period of 2009–2014, representing the Golkar party and the East Java IX constituency, which comprises the regencies of Tuban and Bojonegoro. Within Golkar, Satya Widya Yudha once served as Vice Secretary-General of the Central Executive Board for Energy and Natural Resources, as well as Head of Natural Resources in the party's daily executive board. He was also once Vice Treasurer of the Golkar Party’s Central Executive Board.

Early life and family 

SWY was born in Kediri City, East Java Province on November 10, 1961. SWY is married to Diah Ambarsari and had two children, namely Dyah Roro Esti Widya Putri. Diah Ambarsari had completed her Masters education at Imperial College London, and graduated in 2017. Satya Hangga Yudha Widya Putra, has completed his Masters education at New York University (NYU) and graduated in 2017. At this time Satya and his wife reside in Pondok Indah, South Jakarta, Jakarta, Indonesia.

Education 
SWY holds a Bachelor of marine engineering (S1) from the Institut Teknologi Sepuluh Nopember (ITS), Surabaya. During his career, SWY also continued his education to Masters level at Cranfield University School of Industrial and Manufacturing Science in Bedford, United Kingdom and earned a postgraduate degree (MSc) in Oil and Gas Project Quality Management. SWY also attended Executive Development, from Blavatnik School of Government, Oxford University. Currently, in the midst of his busy schedule, Satya is still trying to complete his doctorate (PhD) program in the energy sector at Cranfield University School of Water, Energy and Environment (SWEE) (SWEE) and the School of Management, which he is currently taking.

Early career 
In the oil and gas field, he once served as Director of Federal Relations and Business Development for the Atlantic Richfield Company (ARCO), and later for British Petroleum (BP) in Washington, D.C., U.S. when BP acquired ARCO. He was later entrusted to serve as Director of International Affairs of BP Plc, stationed in London. He then returned to Indonesia to serve for two and a half years as Vice President of BP Indonesia. He later served as LNG Supply and Development Director of BP China in Beijing. In China, Satya then continued his career at BP Vietnam as Business Strategy Director. His last professional stint was as BP representative at VICO Indonesia as Director of Business Development of Coalbed Methane (CBM), before finally starting his political career in parliament until the end of 2019 and being in the Government as a Member of the National Energy Council.

Political career 
SWY served as a member of the People's Representative Council (DPR RI) for the period 2009-2014 representing the Golkar Party in the electoral district of East Java IX (Tuban Regency and Bojonegoro Regency). In the 2014 Legislative Election, SWY was re-elected from the same electoral district for the 2014-2019 period. He served as Deputy Chairman of Commission VII DPR RI from 2014-2018, in charge of Energy and Mineral Resources, Research and Technology, and the Environment. In April 2018, SWY received a new assignment as Deputy Chair of Commission I of the DPR until September 30, 2019, which oversees issues in the Defense, Foreign Affairs, Communication and Information and Intelligence sectors.

During his time in the House of Representatives, Satya was once appointed Head of the Indonesian Parliamentary Delegation in 2011 for the Parliamentary Conference on the WTO. He also served as Vice Head of the Special Committee for the Review of the Law on Geothermal, Head of the Delegation of the Special Committee for the Review of the Law on Geothermal to New Zealand, member of the Special Committee for the Law on Engineering, Working Committee for the Geospatial Information Bill, Working Committee for Oil and Gas, Working Committee for Mineral and Coal, Working Committee for the Ratification of the HAZE Agreement, Working Committee for the Ratification of the Nagoya Protocol, and many more.

During the current 2014–2019 period, Satya Widya Yudha was mandated to be the Vice Chairman of Commission VII of the House of Representatives, before being replaced by Fadel Muhammad. He is also the architect and chairman of the Green Economy and Alternative Energy Caucus of the House of Representatives.

In his political career at Golkar, Satya once served as Vice Secretary-General of the Central Executive Board for Energy and Natural Resources, as well as serving in the daily executive board as Head of Natural Resources. He is currently Vice Treasurer of the party’s Central Executive Committee.

Satya also currently serves as Head of the Alumni Expert Board of his old campus, Institut Teknologi Sepuluh Nopember, for the period of 2015–2019. He was also appointed by his colleagues to be the Chairman of the Indonesian Chapter of the Cranfield University Alumni.

Career in Geopolitical and Energy Sector 
Satya has expertise in geopolitics and energy economics with a special focus on Indonesia, China and Vietnam. He is resourceful in combining knowledge of the energy industry and market with geopolitics and the energy economy of Asia and the world. In his work, Satya specializes in energy security, energy subsidies, strategic bilateral relations in energy, and risk assessments of national investments. For this, the National Resilience Institute (Lembaga Ketahanan Nasional) has repeatedly requested his presence to be a speaker. Most recently, in early August 2016, Satya was invited to be a speaker at a public discussion with the theme "Realizing Energy Sovereignty in order to Increase Public Welfare in the Context of National Resilience".

Satya has written and spoken extensively on Indonesia and issues of global energy for the energy industry, government, research institutions, media and various forums such as the Asia Public Policy Forum from Harvard Kennedy School and the University of Indonesia, the Indonesia Petroleum Association convention, the Indonesia Gas Association conference, the IndoCBM conference, the Indonesia Focus Conference at Michigan State University, the Indonesian Petroleum Engineers Association (IATMI) Inspiring Talk, conference of the Natural Resources Governance Institute at St. Catherine's College, Oxford University, as well as various other occasions. Satya also spoke at the United Nations Sustainable Stock Exchanges (SSE) Leaders Luncheon on Climate, which was part of the United Nations Climate Change Conference (COP21) in Paris, late 2015.

With his myriad of experiences, Satya was requested to be a responder during the launching of the Indonesia Energy Outlook, together with Executive Director of the International Energy Agency (IEA), Dr. Fatih Birol in July, 2016.

Award 
In 2013, along with Joko Widodo (then-Governor of DKI Jakarta), Sharif Cicip Sutardjo (then-Minister of Maritime Affairs and Fisheries), Yusril Ihza Mahendra (previously Minister of State Secretariat), Roy Suryo (then-Minister of Youth and Sports Affairs), and conglomerate Hary Tanoesoedibjo, Satya received the ‘Right Man On The Right Place’ award in the category of Committed Achievement from Lensa Indonesia.

References 

Members of the People's Representative Council, 2014
1961 births
Living people